The Cultural Heritage Park (CHP) is a multifunctional park in South District, Taichung, Taiwan.

History
The buildings in the park were originally built in 1916 as brewery factory during the Japanese rule of Taiwan. After the handover of Taiwan from Japan to the Republic of China in 1945, the area was taken over by Taiwan Tobacco and Wine Monopoly Bureau. It continued the brewing business until the urban sprawl of Taichung City forced the factory production to relocate in  1998. The area was then left abandoned.

In 2002, the Taichung City Government designated 16 out of 28 buildings in the area as historic monuments. In 2007, the Council for Cultural Affairs took over the area and initiated redevelopment works. Two year later in 2009, it was opened to the public as the Taichung Cultural and Creative Industries Park for art exhibition and performance venue. On 30 July 2018, it was relaunched as Cultural Heritage Park for heritage research and restoration venue in a ceremony attended by Culture Minister Cheng Li-chun.

Architecture
The park spans over an area of 5.6 hectares. The park consists of exhibition halls where they exhibit the works of modern designers and architects, as well as contemporary cultural products and handicrafts.

Transportation
The park is accessible within walking distance South West from Taichung Station of the Taiwan Railways.

See also
 List of tourist attractions in Taiwan

References

External links

  

2018 establishments in Taiwan
Art centers in Taichung
Cultural centers in Taichung
Industrial buildings completed in 1916